Number One with a Bullet is a 1987 American police detective film directed by Jack Smight and starring Robert Carradine, Billy Dee Williams, Valerie Bertinelli, Peter Graves, Doris Roberts, Bobby Di Cicco, Ray Girardin, Barry Sattels, Mykelti Williamson, Alex Rebar and Jon Gries.

The film is about two police partners with contrasting personalities who both work for the Los Angeles Police Department.

Plot 
Nick Barzack ("Berserk"), an irrational, unkempt and unpredictable cop, and Frank Hazeltine, his cultured, polite, and suave partner, follow a circuitous and highly circumstantial trail of clues, evidence, witnesses, and accomplices through Los Angeles.  Barzack pauses only briefly for his mother, but repeatedly for his ex-wife.  Hazeltine is almost too busy with every attractive woman he sees to pay attention to the thugs trying to kill him and his partner.  But despite these distractions, Nick's dogged determination to get the man behind the dope scene eventually pays off.

The ladies' man Hazeltine and the borderline psychotic Berzack are narcotics detectives  with a long history of wild behavior and effective work.  Following Nick's hunch, they attempt to trace a new drug "black tar" to its source, beginning at a church fair which ends with Nick in drag and his suspect in an armed standoff. To calm the community, Nick and Frank are sent out of town to pick up a snitch, Boudreau, who is killed en route before naming his boss.

Nick tries to relieve his own stress by beating up a street pusher, then ends up in his ex-wife's arms, but she wants nothing to do with him. His mother's nagging only serves to remind him of why he is so driven. Frank relaxes with Zen and random women, but is inevitably interrupted by Nick's sick sense of humor and drive to get his man.

Following a lead from a fence, they use an addict to locate the hit-man who killed Boudreau (and then the addict), but another hitter puts an end to their investigation. While on forced vacation, they interrogate the pusher Nick encountered earlier, who puts them onto a big deal going down soon. When their surveillance is interrupted and the kingpins nearly escape, followed by attempts on both of their lives and Nick's ex, they realize they are fighting a mole in their own department. Nick cracks, and threatens his suspected drug lord without evidence, and is suspended. But with help from Nick's mom and the fence, they set a plan in motion to expose the mole and the real ringleader.

Cast 
 Billy Dee Williams as Hazeltine
 Robert Carradine as Barzack
 Valerie Bertinelli as Teresa
 Doris Roberts as Mrs. Barzack
 Peter Graves as Capt. Ferris
 Alex Rebar as Boudreau

Production
Jack Smight said he wanted to cast Denzel Washington but Cannon were not interested. He says the film "never saw the light of day."

The black semi used in this film was the TV series Knight Rider black semi that was used in the third and fourth seasons.

References

External links 
 
 
 

1987 films
1980s crime action films
American crime action films
American buddy films
American buddy cop films
American police detective films
Films set in Los Angeles
Golan-Globus films
Vestron Pictures films
Buddy drama films
1980s buddy cop films
Films with screenplays by Gail Morgan Hickman
Films produced by Menahem Golan
Fictional portrayals of the Los Angeles Police Department
Films produced by Yoram Globus
1980s English-language films
1980s American films